Nagqu Dagring Airport is a planned airport that will serve Seni in the Nagqu of Tibet. The airport is part of a Chinese government development scheme to build 97 airports across China by 2020. By then, the authorities intend that four-fifths of China's population will be within a 90-minute drive of an airport.

In 2015 it was announced that construction of the airport has been delayed due to the necessity to develop higher technological standards on very high altitude buildings (China has the world's four highest airports).

References 

Airports in the Tibet Autonomous Region
Proposed airports in China